Oenomaus atesa is a species of butterfly of the family Lycaenidae. It is a widespread species that has been recorded from Mexico, Panama, western Ecuador, French Guiana, Venezuela, Colombia, eastern Ecuador, Peru and Brazil.

References

Butterflies described in 1867
Eumaeini
Lycaenidae of South America
Taxa named by William Chapman Hewitson